Under the Blacklight is the fourth and final full-length studio album released by American alternative rock band Rilo Kiley. It was released on August 20, 2007, in the United Kingdom - three years and three days after the release of their third album, More Adventurous. Warner Bros. Records released the album one day later in the United States. "Silver Lining" was No. 27 on Rolling Stones list of the 100 Best Songs of 2007.

Album history
The album marks the return of the band following individual solo projects. On January 24, 2006, Jenny Lewis released Rabbit Fur Coat while Blake Sennett released Sun, Sun, Sun with The Elected.

The album was produced by the band with Jason Lader and Mike Elizondo. The first single to be released from the album was "The Moneymaker." The second single was "Silver Lining".

Several tracks from Blacklight were leaked in advance of the album's official release date. On August 17, 2007, the band started streaming the whole album on their MySpace page.

The album's jewel case is tinted purple, reminiscent of a blacklight. The album's covers and inlays were designed by Lewis and Pierre de Reeder, with photography by Autumn de Wilde. The liner notes do not feature any song lyrics.

The band's first official major label debut features a number of guests musicians, including Jackson Browne, Alex Greenwald of Phantom Planet and James Valentine and Mickey Madden from Maroon 5. However, the album credits do not state on which songs the guests appear.

Under the Blacklight debuted at number 22 on the U.S. Billboard 200, selling about 27,000 copies in its first week. As of December 2012, sales in the United States have exceeded 186,000 copies, according to Nielsen SoundScan.

On September 25, 2007, Rilo Kiley appeared on Jimmy Kimmel Live! to perform "Dreamworld." "Dreamworld" was the first Rilo Kiley song to become popular in Russia. In November 2007 it was added to the playlist of Maximum, one of the most popular stations in Russia.

"Breakin' Up" was heard at the end of the Grey's Anatomy season 4 episode "Forever Young." "The MoneyMaker" was used as the background music in promotional spots for Fox Network's "Canterbury's Law" and a 2009 Carl's Jr. ad featuring Audrina Patridge. "15" was included in the "Clearance Sale" show of Season 3 of Bob Dylan's Theme Time Radio in April 2009.

Critical reception

Blacklight tells a dark story. It is "an album written about Los Angeles' sketchy side... of characters starving for fame and fortune". At Metacritic, which assigns a normalized rating out of 100 to reviews from mainstream critics, the album received an average score of 71, based on 32 reviews, which indicates "generally favorable reviews." The album received many Fleetwood Mac comparisons. Critics praised the band's move into a newer sound, with Rolling Stone calling it "yet even more adventurous" (referring to the band's 2004 album More Adventurous).

This album was #8 on Rolling Stone list of the Top 50 Albums of 2007.

The "January/February 2008" issue of Blender Magazine named Under the Blacklight the tenth best album of 2007, referring to it as "an album of classically sleek, apocalyptic '70s L.A. coke-rock, in the fine Fleetwood Mac and Steely Dan tradition."

Track listing
All songs written by Jenny Lewis, except where noted.

Personnel
Jenny Lewis – vocals, keyboards, guitar
Blake Sennett – guitar, keyboards, vocals (lead on "Dreamworld")
Pierre de Reeder – bass guitar, guitar, backing vocals
Jason Boesel – drums, percussion
Danny Cooksey - Backing Vocals

Chart performance

Release history

Credits
All songs published by Deprecious Music/Wonderful Pony Music/Big Blue Boat Music/BB Lindstrom (all BMI) except:
"Dreamworld" published by Deprecious Music/Wonderful Pony Music/Big Blue Boat Music/BB Lindstrom/Morgan Nagler (all BMI)
"Dejalo" published by Deprecious Music/Wonderful Pony Music/Big Blue Boat Music/BB Lindstrom (all BMI)/Point Longstreet Publishing (ASCAP)

Producers – Rilo Kiley, Jason Lader, Mike Elizondo
Engineers – Adam Hawkins, Brent Arrowood, Michael Bloom, Jedidiah Burtoft, Scott McKay Gibson, Danny Kalb, Bill Mims & Jason Mott
Mixing – Jason Lader, Adam Hawkins
Recording – Jason Lader, Adam Hawkins, Paul Dieter
Mastering - Brian Gardner

References

2007 albums
Rilo Kiley albums
Warner Records albums
Albums produced by Mike Elizondo